Mark Hurst (born December 13, 1972) is a journalist, author, broadcaster, game designer, and Internet entrepreneur. He founded the GEL ("Good Experience Live") tech conference, and hosts a weekly technology-focused radio program, Techtonic, on WFMU. He is the author of two books about technology — one focused on information overload, the other on building customer-friendly products.

Gel conference

Hurst founded the annual Gel conference in 2003, and hosted the event annually in New York through 2016. Gel served to premiere a number of high-profile online projects, including Wikipedia. Jimmy Wales, founder of Wikipedia, first presented the platform at Gel 2005.

Marissa Mayer, then a Google product manager and later CEO of Yahoo!, presented at Gel in 2003 and 2008.

Stewart Butterfield also spoke at Gel 2003, soon after which he co-founded Flickr with Caterina Fake. (Butterfield went on to co-found Slack a few years later.)

Sal Khan, founder of Khan Academy, first presented his educational platform at Gel 2010. Khan Academy has since become a highly popular online education organization.

Gabriel Weinberg, founder of privacy-based search engine DuckDuckGo, debuted his platform at Gel 2013.

Presenters at Gel have included radio host Ira Glass, Improv Everywhere comedian Charlie Todd, health and nutrition academic Marion Nestle, Australian roboticist Rodney Brooks, science writer/futurist David Bodanis, music comedians the Gregory Brothers, NASA deputy administrator Dava Newman, author Marc Abrahams, technologist Anil Dash, composer/conductor Robert Kapilow, artist/photographer Rachel Sussman, artist/writer/animator Zina Saunders, game designer/author Jane McGonigal, media theorist Douglas Rushkoff, and countless others.

In 2006, Hurst presented a European version of Gel, euroGel 2006, in Copenhagen, Denmark. At this conference, Jimmy Wales gave one of the first public talks in Europe about Wikipedia.

In 2009 Hurst established a spinoff conference, Gel Health 2009, devoted to issues of health care, in New York.

Although no Gel conferences have been held since 2016, Hurst hosted two Skeptech forums at WFMU in 2017, and a third Skeptech hosted over Zoom during pandemic lockdown in October 2020. The Aspen Institute blog noted that "Mark Hurst launched the platform Skeptech to address what he sees as the tech industry’s growing systemic problems and 'creepiness.'"

Creative Good and Internet projects

From 1991 to 1995 while a student at MIT, Hurst drew Firehose Tavern, a comic strip published in the MIT student newspaper, The Tech. Starting in 1994, The Tech began posting an archive of the comic strips on its website, making Firehose Tavern one of the first comics available on the Web. While a graduate researcher at the MIT Media Lab in 1995, Hurst created iComix!, a personalized comic strip, cited in the 1996 patent for Microsoft Comic Chat.

After graduating from MIT, Hurst landed a job with web startup Yoyodyne, where he served as director of product development. "In the 18 months I spent at Yoyodyne," said Hurst, "I designed all the games and user interfaces that over a million Net users played. I designed email games, Web games, Shockwave, Java, real-time, chat, AOL, MSN, you name it. Any environment online, I was there." Seth Godin, Yoyodyne founder and president, described Hurst (in a 1997 New York Times profile about Hurst) as "one of the smartest people I have ever met, a person with a unique and correct vision of where interface is going." Hurst left Yoyodyne in January 1997 to found Creative Good.

Hurst founded Creative Good, a tech consulting firm, in 1997. His Creative Good email newsletter is one of the longest continually published email newsletters in the world, having been launched in 1998. Many past columns are stored in the Creative Good blog. The November/December 2021 issue of American Libraries quoted Hurst's Creative Good column from August 27, 2021.

In 2003, one year before the launch of Yelp, Hurst launched a restaurant-review site called AddYourOwn.com. A New York Times article about the platform explained, "Organized by neighborhood, the site allows anyone to add restaurant reviews or to freely edit existing ones. For now, it covers Manhattan and Brooklyn."

Also in 2003, Hurst launched This Is Broken, a blog collecting examples of flawed designs in products and services. The idea for This Is Broken came from Seth Godin, who suggested to Mark that he launch the site and later featured the site on his blog. Godin gave a talk based on This Is Broken at Hurst's Gel 2006 conference and later wrote about the Gel talk that "my funniest TED talk wasn't even given at TED." Hurst posted the final This Is Broken entry in July 2007, marking four years of the project.

In 2005, Hurst launched GoodTodo.com, one of the first todo lists launched on the web. In a July 2021 Wired article about productivity, Clive Thompson mentioned Good Todo as "one of the first productivity apps." Gina Trapani mentioned the service in a 2007 review of Hurst's book Bit Literacy. Seth Godin mentioned it on his blog in 2006.

In 2011 Forbes managing editor Bruce Upbin called Hurst a "user experience jedimaster."

In 2019 writer Douglas Rushkoff wrote that Hurst "was one of the first to argue for a more appropriate engagement with our tech."

In 2020, Hurst launched GoodReports.com, comprising "recommendations for genuinely good, helpful, non-toxic" social media alternatives to Big Tech. In 2021, Components wrote that Good Reports is "a thoughtfully compiled Wirecutter-esque set of lists of the best tools," though it "can at times verge on Luddism."

Radio

Hurst has hosted Techtonic on WFMU since September 2017. He describes the show's theme as "our shift to a digital future." From 2017 to 2019 Hurst's guests included such leading figures in tech evolution as entrepreneur Jaron Lanier, Prof. Safiya Noble, author Douglas Rushkoff, author Astra Taylor, Harvard Business School professor emerita Shoshana Zuboff, Meetup founder Scott Heiferman, journalists Clive Thompson and Tim Harford, and writer-film producer Jonathan Taplin.

In 2020 his guests included author/journalist Steven Levy; BoingBoing blogger/journalist/science fiction author Cory Doctorow; Jason Fried, cofounder of Basecamp and Hey.com; Financial Times associate editor Rana Foroohar; astrophysicist Katie Mack; author/literary critic/professor Alan Jacobs; and Toby Ord, Senior Research Fellow at the University of Oxford's Future of Humanity Institute.

Techtonic guests in 2021 included novelist Jonathan Lethem; writers Paul Kingsnorth and David Bodanis; author/journalists Annie Jacobsen, Andrea Pitzer, and Paul Bradley Carr; journalist Gretchen Peters; and Nabiha Syed, president of The Markup.

Books

Hurst is the author of Bit Literacy: Productivity in the Age of Information and E-mail Overload (2007). Besides the original English edition, the book was translated and published in Russia and China.

His second book was Customers Included: How to Transform Products, Companies, and the World - With a Single Step (2013, 2nd edition 2015). In 2015, Business Insider quoted Hurst's writing in an article about major retailers acknowledging the advantages of online customer reviews to better market their products.

Personal

Hurst grew up around the world as the son of a U.S. Navy officer. He's an Eagle Scout and holds bachelor's and master's degrees in computer science from MIT. He lives in New York City with his wife and son.

References

American radio hosts
Living people
1972 births
Mass media theorists
Internet theorists
MIT School of Engineering alumni
Technology writers
American bloggers
American male bloggers
American Internet celebrities
American computer businesspeople
American technology chief executives
American game designers
People from Portsmouth, Virginia